The Town of St. Lucie Village is a town in St. Lucie County, Florida, United States. The population was 590 at the 2010 census. It is part of the Port St. Lucie Metropolitan Statistical Area.

St. Lucie Village was incorporated in 1961 and includes the St. Lucie Village Historic District.

Geography

St. Lucie Village is located at  (27.493600, –80.342354).

According to the United States Census Bureau, the town has a total area of 0.8 square miles (2.1 km), all land.

Demographics

As of the census of 2000, there were 604 people, 278 households, and 170 families residing in the town. The racial makeup of the town was 96.85% White, 0.99% African American, 0.17% Native American, 0.83% from other races, and 1.16% from two or more races. Hispanic or Latino of any race were 2.32% of the population.

There were 278 households, out of which 23.7% had children under the age of 18 living with them, 50.7% were married couples living together, 6.5% had a female householder with no husband present, and 38.5% were non-families. 32.0% of all households were made up of individuals, and 11.5% had someone living alone who was 65 years of age or older.  The average household size was 2.17 and the average family size was 2.68.

In the town, the population was spread out, with 18.4% under the age of 18, 5.6% from 18 to 24, 25.5% from 25 to 44, 30.8% from 45 to 64, and 19.7% who were 65 years of age or older.  The median age was 45 years. For every 100 females, there were 106.1 males.  For every 100 females age 18 and over, there were 108.0 males.

The median income for a household in the town was $43,611, and the median income for a family was $51,667. Males had a median income of $31,607 versus $29,250 for females. The per capita income for the town was $25,651.  About 1.9% of families and 4.0% of the population were below the poverty line, including 0.8% of those under age 18 and 6.8% of those age 65 or over.

References

Towns in St. Lucie County, Florida
Port St. Lucie metropolitan area
Towns in Florida